Leonīds Beresņevs (Leonid Arkadyevich Beresnev; born 6 July 1958) is a Latvian/Soviet former ice hockey player and coach.

Born in Kirov Oblast he is a coach of the Latvian U-20 junior team.

His first term of coaching the Latvian national team was from 1996 till 1999. In the 1996 world championships, when Latvia was playing in division B, they won and for the first time were promoted to division A where they finished at 7th place in 1997. From that time they have remained in division A.

Beresņevs' second term started in 2004 and ended in 2006. In 2005 Latvia qualified for Torino Olympics where they took the last place.

Beresņevs has been a coach for almost all the best Latvian ice hockey clubs since 1995. In 1996/1997 his coached Juniors Riga took gold at EEHL. In 2003/2004 Beresņevs was head coach in Russian Hockey Super League team Amur Khabarovsk. In 2007-08 he trained Estonian ice hockey club Tartu Big Diamonds and in 2008-09 he became the coach of Latvian club ASK/Ogre.

Career statistics (as a player)

References

External links

1958 births
Living people
Soviet emigrants to Latvia
People from Kirovo-Chepetsk
Latvian ice hockey defencemen
Latvia men's national ice hockey team coaches
Latvian sports coaches
Latvian ice hockey coaches
Dinamo Riga players
Soviet ice hockey defencemen